This is a list of yacht clubs.

See also

List of yacht clubs in Australia
List of yacht clubs that have competed for the America's Cup

References